The Kyrgyzstan national football team ( (Kyrgyz Respublikasynyn uluttuk kurama komandasy);  (Sbornaya Kirgizskoi Respubliki po Futbolu)), officially recognised by FIFA and AFC as Kyrgyz Republic, represents Kyrgyzstan in international football and is controlled by the Kyrgyz Football Union, a member of the Asian Football Confederation (AFC) and Central Asian Football Association.

Results and fixtures

Matches in the last 12 months, and future scheduled matches

2022

2023

Coaching staff

Coaching history

Players

Current squad
The following players were called up for the Friendly match against Russia on 24 September 2022.

Caps and goals correct as of 24 September 2022, after the match against Russia.

Recent call ups

Notes
INJ Withdrew from the squad due to an injury
PRE Preliminary squad

Player records 

Players in bold are still active with Kyrgyzstan.

Most appearances

Top goalscorers

Competitive record

FIFA World Cup

AFC Asian Cup

AFC Challenge Cup

West Asian Championship

ELF Cup 
In 2006, Kyrgyzstan took part in the inaugural ELF Cup in Northern Cyprus. This competition was originally intended to be for teams that were not members of FIFA; however, the organisers extended invitations to both Kyrgyzstan and Tajikistan, who were both represented by their national futsal teams.

*Draws include knockout matches decided via penalty shoot-out.

Head-to-head record

References

External links 

Kyrgyzstan at FIFA.com
Kyrgyz FA 

 
Asian national association football teams